Ishak Talal Boussouf (born August 22, 2001) is an Algerian professional footballer who plays as a winger for CR Belouizdad, on loan from Lommel.

Club career
In the 2019–20 season Boussouf, started his career with the first team and his first game in the Ligue 1 was against NA Hussein Dey as a substitute and made an assist for Souibaâh in 4–3 loss. After his great performance, on January 2, he sinning the first professional contract for two seasons Especially after receiving official offers from ES Tunis and Monaco. With the possibility of going if he received an official offer from a European team at the end of the season. A week after Boussouf scored his first goals against MC Alger in 2–1 victory.

In October 2020, Boussouf joined Belgian side Lommel on a five-year deal.Boussouf was injured upon his arrival, we waited until 13 March 2021 for Boussouf to make his debut, he made his debut against Westerlo and his second match against Lierse where he was in the opportunity of a goal by making a pass to a teammate assist.

International career
Boussouf has represented Algeria at under-20 level.

Career statistics

Club

References

External links
 

2001 births
Living people
Algerian footballers
ES Sétif players
Lommel S.K. players
Association football wingers
Algerian Ligue Professionnelle 1 players
Algeria youth international footballers
Algerian expatriate footballers
Expatriate footballers in Belgium
Algerian expatriate sportspeople in Belgium
21st-century Algerian people